The Lansing Board of Water & Light is a publicly owned, municipal utility that provides electricity and water to the residents of the cities of Lansing and East Lansing, Michigan, and the surrounding townships of Delta, Delhi, Meridian and DeWitt. The Lansing Board of Water & Light also provides steam and chilled water services within the City of Lansing.

History 
The Lansing Board of Water & Light is a municipal utility, owned by the citizens of Lansing, Michigan. The utility's roots go back to 1885, when Lansing citizens approved a $100,000 bond issue to build a water system to provide for drinking water and fire protection. Electricity was added to its list of utility services in 1892, and steam heat in 1919.

System Information 
The Lansing Board of Water & Light has an electric generating capacity of 510 megawatts. The BWL's transmission line voltage is 138,000 volts. The BWL's distribution voltages are 13,200/7,620Y, 8,320/4,800Y and 4,160/2,400Y.

Maximum daily demand is on the order of 33 MGD, while the maximum hourly demand rate can be on the order of 42 MGD. Raw water is obtained exclusively by pumping from 124 wells located throughout the Lansing area. All system pressure is generated via pumping; the Lansing Board of Water & Light does not maintain any elevated water storage tanks.

Water Utility 

The Lansing Board of Water & Light obtains all raw water from a series of wells located throughout the city of Lansing, making it one of the few public utilities for large cities that provides water exclusively from wells. The raw water is pumped directly to two conditioning plants: the John Dye plant located in downtown Lansing and the Wise Road plant located on the southwest side of the city. At these plants, water hardness is reduced from approximately 411 parts per million (ppm) to about 85 ppm. The finished water is then chlorinated and fluorinated, and sent to storage prior to distribution.

At the John Dye conditioning plant, two pumping stations draw finished water from three ground level storage facilities and pump to the distribution system. The Dye pump station, pumps water to the north towards Dewitt Township, Bath Township, and Watertown Township, to the west to Delta Township, and to the local distribution system. The Cedar Street pump station provides supplemental pumping capacity during periods of high demand. The Wise Road conditioning plants similarly pumps water directly into the distribution system, and generally feeds portions of Windsor Township, Delhi Township, and Alaiedon Township.

The Lansing Board of Water & Light retail customers consist of residential, commercial and industrial customers within the service areas, totaling approximately 56,000 customers. Approximately 48,000 of these customers are residential, 7,000 commercial, while the remaining customers consist of industrial customers. In addition, the Lansing Board of Water & Light sells water on a wholesale basis to the local distribution systems in Delta Township and Meridian Township.

Electric Utility 

BWL's largest power plant is the Otto E. Eckert Station, and was named after the utility's general manager from 1927 to 1966. The coal-fired generating station is located in downtown Lansing on the Grand River, adjacent to General Motors' Grand River Assembly Plant and the now-demolished Lansing Car Assembly Plant. Begun in 1922 and completed the following year, the power station has undergone numerous expansions and additions since, with the addition of the three chimneys in 1981. The station has a generating capacity of 351 megawatts, produced by burning coal from Wyoming's Powder River Basin. This plant has three  smokestacks, the tallest self-supporting structures in south central Michigan. These stacks are visible from fifteen miles (24 km) on a clear day. The stacks are known locally by the names of Wynken, Blynken, and Nod, after the fishermen in a poem of the same name by Eugene Field. It was announced in December 2017 that the plant decommissioning has been accelerated, and is now scheduled to go offline in 2020.

The BWL's secondary generating plant is the Claud R. Erickson Station, named after general manager of the utility from 1966 to 1972. The plant located in Delta Township on Canal Road just south of Mt. Hope Road. This plant, built in 1973, is coal-fired and has a single generating unit with a capacity of 159 megawatts and is connected to the power grid by three 138,000 volt lines.  The LBWL announced in December 2017 that they would be replacing Erickson Station with a $500 million natural gas-fired power plant capable of generating 250 megawatts to be completed by 2021.

As an eventual replacement for the aging Eckert Station, the utility began operating the REO Town Cogeneration Plant on July 1, 2013.  The eight-story,  cogeneration facility located on Washington Avenue in Lansing's REO Town district has a capacity of 100 megawatts, and burns natural gas to generate electricity and steam.  It also includes the utility's headquarters and a restored Grand Trunk Western Railroad depot, which is used as the boardroom for the utility and as meeting space.

To achieve the state-mandated 10% renewable energy requirement, the company has built or acquired power through purchase agreements from several new sources. They contracted for 19.2MW from eight new wind turbines at the Beebe Wind Farm in Gratiot County. Lansing Board of Water and Light owns the 0.5MW Moores Park hydroelectric plant on the Grand River and the 0.16MW Cedar Street Solar Array. It also purchases power from the Tower/Kleber Hydro plant near Cheboygan and the Granger Landfill Energy plant. Lansing Board of Water & Light has issued a request for  proposals for 20MW of additional solar power.

During periods of high demand, the Lansing Board of Water and Light purchases electricity from MISO. The BWL has two 138KV interconnections (Davis-Oneida line and the Davis-Enterprise line) with Consumers Energy/METC from its substation on Jolly Road just east of Pennsylvania Ave on Lansing's south side. The utility also owns a portion of Detroit Edison's Belle River Power Plant near St. Clair, Michigan.

The utility's power plant inventory once included the 25 megawatt Ottawa Street Station on the Grand River in downtown Lansing. This steam and electrical plant operated from its completion in 1940 until 1992, when it was decommissioned as a power station, with steam and electrical production transferred to the Eckert Station. The station was put back into partial usage as a water chiller plant for the utility in 2001 to cool downtown buildings. In late 2007, LBWL sold the mostly vacant station to Accident Fund Insurance Company, which was renovated into their headquarters. At the end of December of that year, in preparation for the renovation, the iconic smokestack portion of the building was taken down.

See also 
 List of public utilities

References

External links 
 Lansing Board of Water and Light Official site

Companies based in Lansing, Michigan
Municipal electric utilities of the United States
Water companies of the United States
Public utilities of the United States
1885 establishments in Michigan